Anthony Joseph Murray (April 30, 1904 – March 19, 1974) was an outfielder in Major League Baseball. He played in two games for the Chicago Cubs.

References

External links

1904 births
1974 deaths
Major League Baseball outfielders
Chicago Cubs players
Baseball players from Chicago